The ancient Egyptian noble Pabasa was chief steward of the God's Wife of Amun  Nitocris I during the Saite Period. He is buried in tomb TT279, which is located in the El-Assasif, part of the Theban Necropolis, near Thebes.

His sarcophagus was acquired in Paris in 1836 by Alexander Douglas-Hamilton, 10th Duke of Hamilton and was kept at Hamilton Palace until it was given to the Kelvingrove Art Gallery and Museum in Glasgow by the Hamilton Estate Trustees in 1922.

One of Pabasa's grandsons was Pedubast, the chief steward and overseer of Upper Egypt, whose burial was discovered in 2015, located within the tomb TT391 at El-Assasif.

References

People of the Twenty-sixth Dynasty of Egypt
Ancient Egyptian high stewards